Lior Suchard (born 6 December 1981) is an Israeli mentalist and self-described "mystifier" who performs "supernatural entertainment".

Early life
Suchard was born in Haifa, Israel, as the youngest of three brothers. In an interview, he said that, as a child, he was a quiet math student who was harassed by the more popular children. At a young age, he first performed in front of school children, and at 14 he began to do shows at events and birthdays parties. He is a graduate of the Reali School in Haifa.

Early stage career and The Successor
After completing three years of military service as a Patriot fighter in the Israeli Air Force, Suchard began to increase his appearances in Israel. His first national television exposure was on various morning shows.

In 2005 he was invited to appear on The Successor (also known as The Next Uri Geller), Uri Geller's Israeli TV show, which was aired in late 2006. Suchard beat eight other candidates and won the competition to be Geller's successor. This was an international breakthrough for Suchard because the program was sold to and broadcast in several countries, including Germany, Poland and Italy.

National and international success
After winning The Successor, his career as a mentalist took off in both Israel and abroad.

Israel
 In Friday's Studio, the Friday evening edition of News 2, Suchard was described as "conquering the stages of the world, a huge star, filling halls, a regular guest on entertainment programs on the world's largest television networks, and whose book was hijacked from the shelves."
 In 2011, the documentary Skeptical dealt with the development of his international career as a sensory artist. The film was screened on Channel 2 in 2012.
 After his name became known in Israel and around the world, he hosted and directed the game show Money Pump, which was broadcast in May 2012 on Channel 2.
 In 2013, during the elections to the Nineteenth Knesset, Suchard was invited to predict the results of the elections about ten days before counting the votes. He wrote the results on a note enclosed in an envelope that was placed in a vault under strict guard at the Dizengoff Center in Tel Aviv throughout the days leading up to the election. After the counting of votes, it was revealed that Suchard had accurately predicted the results.
 In 2017, he presented safety instructions in El Al Airlines videos, which replaced the old animations.

United States
In the United States, he has appeared on the following programs:
 The Tonight Show with Jay Leno, on which he appeared five times (2010, 2011, 2012, and twice in 2013)
 The View (March 2013)
 Larry King Now (March 2013)
 The Doctors (2015)
 Good Morning America (2016)
 The Late Late Show with James Corden, in which he stole the show in January 2016 when he stunned actor Harry Connick Jr., who escaped from the stage twice during his performance because he was so spooked. One of his tricks was to have everyone present draw the same picture, a star. He claimed he had influenced them to draw it by showing them sample drawings that looked like an S, T, A, and R. He also appeared on September 25, 2017, with America Ferrera and Jeremy Piven, and in which "From glow sticks to predicting time, Lior stole the show, blowing everyone's minds more than once." He appeared on March 5, 2019, with Jonas Brothers. 
Live with Kelly and Ryan on 18 July 2018
Dr. Phil on 16 March 2019
co-host Brain Games 2020
The Ellen DeGeneres Show 2020
In 2010 he placed 28th on People Magazine'''s Sexiest Men Alive list.

In 2012 to celebrate the 70th birthday of Barbra Streisand, the mentalist was invited to be the main show during which he stunned the famous guests.

In 2016, he performed the halftime show during Streisand's nine-city tour. The first performance was attended by about 7,000 members and associates of the singer, including entertainment stars, and other performances attracted a crowd of 20,000 people. Streisand's reaction to Suchard's ability was quoted in the Times of Israel:

In 2020 Lior's new show "gone mental with Lior" aired on the video platform Quibi. Lior co-produced and star the show alongside celebrities like Ben Stiller, David Dobrik and Kate Hudson.

Australia
In February 2016 he embarked on a tour of 18 performances in Australia. The tour was very successful, and it was reported that in order to meet the demand for tickets the tour was extended. He appeared in Sydney, Melbourne, Brisbane and Perth, as well as over seven times at the Sydney Opera House.

Suchard has raised interest in various online media channels, such as BuzzFeed, with nearly four million hits on YouTube as of February 2017 at Gold 104.3.

In January 2016, 10 hours before the opening of the 20/20 cricket match between Australia and India, Suchard appeared on Australian television and predicted that Australia would lose to India with a score of 200 to 197. After success in predicting, the demand for tickets to the show exceeded supply. A large rise in the demand for his performances was also a result of a short video he made on the social networks of tennis player Novak Djokovic after he was in the show and defined him as "amazing" and recommended to viewers. Suchard's "guessing" events aroused interest and sympathy from local media and social media. His  performance was described as "surprising" and recommended. The Sydney Morning Herald'' reported that Suchard captures the audience in his performance with a combination with hypnosis, memory exercises, and mathematical techniques passed on to the viewer with humor and grace.

India 
Suchard's live show called "Supernatural Entertainment" won the Best Innovative Act Award at the 2015 Live Quotient Awards in India. In addition, the Indian media extensively covered the precise guessing of the results of the cricket match between the Australian and Indian teams, mentioned above.

Russian is one of the three language versions of his website, the other two being Hebrew and English.

Eurovision 2019 
In 2019, for the first time in the history of the Eurovision song contest, a mentalist was chosen to make a special guest appearance. Lior Suchard appeared in the event's green room, where he presented his special skills and talents to the contestants and to the television audience.

References

External links
 

Hebrew Reali School alumni
Israeli male writers
Israeli magicians
1981 births
Living people
Mentalists
Israeli people of Romanian-Jewish descent